Alaska Electric Light & Power, also known as AEL&P, is the power utility for Juneau, the capital city of Alaska. AEL&P gets their electricity primarily through the Snettisham hydroelectric power plant, located in an uninhabited region  Southeast of downtown Juneau, accessible only by boat and aircraft. The General Manager for the company is Connie Hulbert.

Founded in 1893 by Willis Thorpe, AEL&P is one of the only privately held utilities in the state. It originally ran on local hydroelectric dams run by the mining-focused Treadwell Company. These first dams were constructed on Salmon Creek and Sheep Creek. The current plant at Snettisham was completed in 1973.

On July 1, 2014, Avista Corp., based out of Washington, bought out AEL&P's parent Alaska Energy and Resources Company.

2008 avalanches and emergency power
In April, 2008, a series of massive avalanches outside Juneau heavily damaged the electrical lines providing Juneau with power, knocking the hydroelectric system offline and forcing the utility to switch to a much more expensive diesel system. Diesel generators replaced the hydroelectric power to the municipality in the weeks that followed, leading to temporarily higher utility costs for AEL&P customers until the power lines were repaired.

References

External links

1893 establishments in Alaska
Companies based in Juneau, Alaska
Hydroelectric power companies of the United States
Energy companies established in 1893
American companies established in 1893
Electricity in Alaska